Clube de Regatas do Flamengo, commonly known as Flamengo, is a professional women's association football club based in Rio de Janeiro, Brazil. Founded in 1995, the team is affiliated with FFERJ and play their home games at Estádio da Gávea. The team colors, reflected in their logo and uniform, are red and black. They play in the top tier of women's football in Brazil, the Campeonato Brasileiro de Futebol Feminino, and in the Campeonato Carioca de Futebol Feminino, the first division of the traditional in-state competition. Their players belong to the Brazilian Navy, which has formed a partnership with the team in 2015.

Players

Current squad

Former players
For details of current and former players, see :Category:Clube de Regatas do Flamengo (women) players.

Honours
 Campeonato Brasileiro Série A1
 Winners: 2016

 Campeonato Carioca
 Winners: 2015, 2016, 2017, 2018, 2019

References

External links
  

Association football clubs established in 1997
Women's football clubs in Brazil
1997 establishments in Brazil
Women